The Strange Countess is a 1925 crime novel by the British writer Edgar Wallace.

Film adaptations
In 1961 it was the basis for the 1933 British film The Jewel and for a West German film The Strange Countess, part of a long-running series of Wallace adaptations by Rialto Film.

References

Bibliography
 Goble, Alan. The Complete Index to Literary Sources in Film. Walter de Gruyter, 1999.

External links
 
 

1925 British novels
British crime novels
British novels adapted into films
Novels by Edgar Wallace